Larry Clyde Rakestraw (April 22, 1942 – August 4, 2019) was an American football quarterback in the NFL.  He played three seasons for the Chicago Bears.  Rakestraw attended the University of Georgia where he was a three-year starter at quarterback.  He was a member of the Sigma Chi fraternity. Larry lived in Suwanee, Ga and had 11 grandchildren.  He was inducted into the Georgia Sports Hall of Fame.

College records at UGA

Two time All-Southeastern Conference.
Passed for more than 3,000 yards.
Starting quarterback as a So, Jr and Sr.
Led the SEC in pass completions and passing yardage in his senior year.
Senior Bowl most valuable player.

1963 Georgia vs. Miami 

Rakestraw had 407 yards passing against Miami and broke one NCAA record - and 3 SEC records (414 total offense, 25 pass completions, 407 yards passing yards).

Rakestraw died on August 4, 2019 at the age of 77.

References

1942 births
2019 deaths
American football quarterbacks
Chicago Bears players
Georgia Bulldogs football players
People from Mableton, Georgia
Players of American football from Georgia (U.S. state)
Sportspeople from Cobb County, Georgia